The chapters of the Rurouni Kenshin were written and illustrated by Nobuhiro Watsuki. The first chapter of Rurouni Kenshin premiered in Shueisha's Weekly Shōnen Jump in 1994 and the series ran in the magazine until 1999.

The 255 individual chapters known as "Acts", as well as a few one-shots authored by Watsuki were collected and published in 28 tankōbon volumes by Shueisha. The first volume was released on September 2, 1994 and the last on November 4, 1999. They re-released the series in a 22-volume kanzenban edition between July 4, 2006 and May 2, 2007. Shueisha published a 14-volume bunkoban edition between January 18, 2012 and July 18, 2012. A single chapter follow up to the series, was originally published in Weekly Shōnen Jump after the conclusion of the series. The chapter is focused on Myōjin Yahiko some time after the end of the series when he is requested to take care of a dojo for a short time. Left out of the original volumes, the chapter added as an extra to the final kanzenban release.

The first eighteen volumes were adapted into an anime produced by Studio Deen, and aired in Japan from January 10, 1996 to September 8, 1998. Additionally, several parts of the following volumes were adapted into two original video animations series.

Rurouni Kenshin was licensed for an English-language release in North America by Viz Media. The first volume of the series was released on October 7, 2003. The first volumes were published irregularly, but a monthly basis was established by Viz media after volume seven due to good sales and consumer demands. The last volume was published on July 5, 2006. Yahiko no Sakabatō was also serialized in Shonen Jump during 2006. Between January 29, 2008 and March 16, 2010, Viz re-released the manga in a nine-volume omnibus format called "Viz Big Edition", which collects three volumes in one. The ninth and final volume includes Yahiko no Sakabato and Cherry Blossoms in Spring. They released a similar "3-in-1 Edition" across nine volumes between January 3, 2017 and January 1, 2019.

Volume list

Notes

References

External links
Rurouni Kenshin official Viz Media website
Rurouni Kenshin official website 

Rurouni Kenshin
Chapters